The England cricket team toured New Zealand between February and April 2018 to play two Test and five One Day International (ODI) matches. Fixtures in round 7 of New Zealand's 2016–17 Plunket Shield season were played as day/night matches, in preparation for a day/night Test match, which took place at Eden Park. In August 2017, New Zealand Cricket confirmed that the Test at Eden Park would be played as a day/night game. In September 2017, the second ODI fixture was moved from McLean Park, Napier to the Bay Oval in Mount Maunganui, after issues in re-turfing the ground.

England won the ODI series 3–2. New Zealand won the Test series 1–0, after the second match ended in a draw. It was New Zealand's first series win against England since August 1999 and their first at home since March 1984.

Squads

Prior to the ODI series Liam Plunkett was ruled out of England's ODI squad with Craig Overton named as his replacement. After the first ODI, Mark Chapman was added to New Zealand's squad as cover for Kane Williamson, who was suffering with a hamstring injury. 

James Anderson was named as the vice-captain of England's Test squad. Mitchell Santner, who played in New Zealand's ODI matches, was not selected for the Test series after suffering a knee injury. He was ruled out of action for six to nine months, with Todd Astle selected in the squad in his absence. Before the Test series, Mason Crane was ruled out of England's squad due to stress fracture in his lower back and he was replaced by Jack Leach. Before the first Test, Martin Guptill was added to New Zealand's squad as a batting cover, while Ross Taylor recovered from injury. Todd Astle was ruled out of the second Test and was replaced by Ish Sodhi in New Zealand's squad.

T20I series

ODI series

1st ODI

2nd ODI

3rd ODI

4th ODI

5th ODI

Tour matches

Two-day match: New Zealand XI vs England

Two-day match: New Zealand XI vs England

Test series

1st Test

2nd Test

Notes

References

External links
 Series home at ESPN Cricinfo

2018 in English cricket
2018 in New Zealand cricket
International cricket competitions in 2017–18
2017-18